The Terraformers is a novel by Annalee Newitz. It was published on January 31, 2023, and was received positively by book critics.

Plot 
Set 60,000 years in the future, The Terraformers traces the development of a terraformed planet over the course of 1,000 years. The planet, Sask-E, has been transformed from a wasteland into a habitable planet by human involvement. Destry, a member of a team dedicated to continuing the planet's transformation, uncovers a secret city underneath the planet's surface that changes her understanding of the planet and her purpose.

Development and writing 
Newitz was inspired to write The Terraformers after thinking about how fictional stories could carry messages relating to present-day environmental crises like climate change. They divided the book into three sections separated by a period of several hundred years each, which they told The Stranger was so they could track the entire terraforming process. The terraforming process they describe within the book was heavily influenced by their own experience as a science journalist and by interviews with scientists in the field.

Publication history 
The Terraformers was published on January 31, 2023, by Tor Publishing.

Reception 
The Terraformers was positively received by book critics. Paul Di Filippo, writing in The Washington Post, described the book as having "enough ideas and incidents to populate half a dozen lesser science fiction books," praising Newitz's prose. A review by Mark Athitakis in the Los Angeles Times positively described the novel's optimistic message but criticized Newitz for what he viewed as cluttered prose.

A starred review in Publishers Weekly praised the book, drawing comparisons between Newitz and fellow science-fiction writers Becky Chambers and Samuel R. Delany. Booklist's Leah von Essen praised Newitz for their sense of humor and for the "pure moments of joy" sprinkled throughout the prose. Library Journal and BookPage both published positive reviews, with the former describing the book as "incredibly emotional and action-packed" and the latter commenting that Newitz was able to comment on social issues without making the reader feel "lectured, bored, or disconnected" from the narrative.

References

External links 

 The Terraformers at BookMarks

2020s science fiction novels
2023 American novels
Tor Books books
Climate change novels